List of Guggenheim Fellowship winners for 1972, have been awarded annually since 1925, by the John Simon Guggenheim Memorial Foundation to those "who have demonstrated exceptional capacity for productive scholarship or exceptional creative ability in the arts."

United States and Canadian fellows 

 Allan Wilson, Biochemistry – Molecular biology
 Kenneth Josephson (1932) – Photography

Latin American Fellows 

Constantino Reyes-Valerio – art historian
Fernando Krahn – animator/cartoonists

See also
 Guggenheim Fellowship

References

External links
Guggenheim Fellows for 1972

1972
1972 awards